Breon O'Casey  (30 April 1928 – 22 May 2011) was an artist associated with the St Ives School.

Biography
O'Casey was born in London to actress Eileen, née Reynolds, and playwright Seán O'Casey. He was educated at Dartington Hall School in Devon and, following his national service duty, attended the Anglo-French Art School, a small school in St John's Wood, London, based on the French model. He was an apprentice to Denis Mitchell and Dame Barbara Hepworth, which informed his own later career. He moved to Cornwall, initially working in the artists' colony of St Ives.

Although primarily a painter, he also made jewelry.

See also
 List of St. Ives artists

References

Further reading
 A Celtic Artist: Breon O'Casey, Jack O'Sullivan with Sophie Bowness, Lund Humphries (2003).
 Obituary of Breon O’Casey, The Daily Telegraph, 1 June 2011

1928 births
2011 deaths
20th-century British painters
British male painters
21st-century British painters
St Ives artists
Painters from London
People educated at Dartington Hall School
20th-century British male artists
21st-century British male artists